Fidel Urbina (born April 24, 1975) is a Mexican national former fugitive who was added to the FBI Ten Most Wanted Fugitives list in June 2012.

Background
Urbina is a Mexican national who was working in Chicago as a car mechanic. In March 1998, he allegedly raped a Chicago waitress in her car and home. Seven months later—while free on bond—he sexually assaulted and murdered 22-year-old Gabriella Torres, whose body was found in the trunk of a burned-out car in a Chicago alley.

Disappearance
Urbina had been the subject of a manhunt since 1999 despite reported sightings in Mexico. A $100,000 reward was offered for information leading to Urbina's arrest.

Urbina was captured on September 22, 2016, in Chihuahua, Mexico, after 17 years on the run.

References

1975 births
1998 murders in the United States
FBI Ten Most Wanted Fugitives
Fugitives
Living people
Mexican emigrants to the United States